Letters from the Earth is a posthumously published work of American author Mark Twain (1835–1910) collated by Bernard DeVoto. It comprises essays written during a difficult time in Twain's life (1904–1909), when he was deeply in debt and had recently lost his wife and one of his daughters. The content concerns morality and religion and strikes a tone that is sarcastic—Twain's own term throughout the book. Initially, Twain's sole surviving child, Clara Clemens, objected to its publication in March 1939, probably because of its controversial and iconoclastic views on religion, claiming it presented a "distorted" view of her father. Henry Nash Smith helped change her position in 1960. Clara explained her change of heart in 1962 saying that "Mark Twain belonged to the world" and that public opinion had become more tolerant. She was also influenced to release the papers by her annoyance with Soviet reports that her father's ideas were being suppressed in the United States. The papers were selected, edited and sequenced for the book in 1939 by Bernard DeVoto.

Content
Letters from the Earth consists of a series of commentaries in essay and short story form. Many of these pieces express Twain's discomfort with and disdain for Christianity, both as a theological position and a lifestyle. The title story consists of eleven letters written by the archangel Satan to archangels Gabriel and Michael, about his observations on the curious proceedings of earthly life and the nature of Man's religions. Other pieces in the book include a morality tale told as a bedtime discussion with Twain's children, Susy and Clara, about a family of cats, and an essay explaining why an anaconda is morally superior to Man.

Date of writing
Letters from the Earth was written after the deaths of Twain's daughter Suzy (1896) and of his wife Olivia (1904). Textual references make clear that sections, at least, of Letters from the Earth were written shortly before his death in April 1910. (For instance, Letter VII, in discussing the ravages of hookworm, refers to the $1,000,000 gift of John D. Rockefeller Jr. to help eradicate the disease, a gift that was announced on October 28, 1909, less than six months before Twain's death.) However, the following excerpt appears in a discussion of the Palestinian town of Nablous, in The Innocents Abroad. This passage was written more than four decades before his death, in 1867 or 1868 and appears to be an oblique reference to the idea that later became Letters from the Earth:

Louis J. Budd, editor of Mark Twain: Collected Tales, Sketches, Speeches, and Essays: Volume 2: 1891–1910 (1992), a volume in the Library of America series, places Letters from the Earth sequentially in 1909.

Dramatic adaptations
A stage adaptation of Letters from the Earth by Dan Savage was produced in Seattle in 2003.

Selected quotations

Letter VIII on "the law of God" expressed by each gender's physical construction:

See also
 The Mysterious Stranger

References

External links

 Audio book: https://archive.org/details/let-1
 Full text of Letters from the Earth
 Letters From The Earth by Mark Twain © Harper & Row, 1962, 1974 originally written in 1909, according to Mark Twain A to Z and Mark Twain's Last Days
 Letters from the earth

1962 short story collections
Short story collections by Mark Twain
Books critical of religion
Books critical of Christianity
Books published posthumously
Fiction about the Devil
Harper & Row books
Black comedy books